Brazil305 is the fourteenth studio album by Cuban-American singer Gloria Estefan, released by Sony Masterworks on August 13, 2020.   It is her twenty-ninth album overall, and consists of re-recorded versions of her greatest hits with Brazilian rhythms especially samba, and lyrics in three languages. It also includes four new songs, featuring the lead single "Cuando Hay Amor". The album won Best Contemporary Tropical Album at the 22nd Annual Latin Grammy Awards.

Critical reception

AllMusic gaved the album a positive review, saying "Estefan has outdone herself on Brazil305: By re-recording her hits, she illustrates the Brazil/Cuba/Africa argument, while welcoming fans along for the ride. She bridges these cultures in an inspiring, polished program that explores new sounds and contexts, while reasserting the eminently translatable appeal and transcendent power of her own music."

Quentin Harrison from Albumism rated the album four out of five stars, saying "The product of this action is an album that reverberates with the vibrancy of a woman still at her artistic best despite what she has already achieved—that is a testament to Estefan's enduring creative excellence."

Track listing

Commercial Performance & Charts

In the United States, Brazil305 debuts with a little over 1,000 equivalent album units earned in the week ending Aug. 20, according to Nielsen Music/MRC Data.

Release history

References

External links
GloriaEstefan.com > Album

2020 albums
Gloria Estefan albums
Albums produced by Emilio Estefan